Cuthona paradoxa is a species of sea slug, an aeolid nudibranch, a marine gastropod mollusc in the family Tergipedidae.

Distribution
This species was described from Winter Quarters, Ross Sea, Antarctica. It has been reported from McMurdo Sound.

References 

Tergipedidae